José Ignacio Sáenz Marín (born 28 September 1973), known as José Ignacio, is a Spanish former footballer who played as a defensive midfielder.

Club career
Born in Logroño, La Rioja, Ignacio made his professional debut for hometown club CD Logroñés. Upon its La Liga relegation at the end of the 1994–95 season he joined Valencia CF, helping with 27 matches to a final runner-up place in his first year.

In the summer of 1997, Ignacio moved to Real Zaragoza, where he would play five seasons. In 2000–01 he scored a career-best six goals, including one in a 14 April 2001 thriller at FC Barcelona that finished 4–4 as the Aragonese went on to barely avoid relegation (17th, adding that year's Copa del Rey), which would eventually befall the next year.

Ignacio joined RC Celta de Vigo for 2002–03, making 33 league appearances as the Galician side achieved a UEFA Champions League berth. However, they would also be relegated the following campaign.

Upon retiring in 2006 at nearly 33, one year after playing only 11 games as Celta returned to the top tier, he rejoined his first team Logroñés as a director of football. In 11 top-flight seasons – out of the 14 he played – he amassed totals of 317 matches and 17 goals.

International career
Ignacio received two caps for Spain during 2001. The first came in the 2002 FIFA World Cup qualifiers against Liechtenstein on 5 September, and he also appeared in a friendly in Huelva with Mexico two months later.

Previously, Ignacio represented the nation at the 1996 Summer Olympics.

Honours

Club
Zaragoza
Copa del Rey: 2000–01

International
Spain U21
UEFA European Under-21 Championship runner-up: 1996

References

External links
 
 Celta de Vigo biography 
 
 
 

1973 births
Living people
Sportspeople from Logroño
Spanish footballers
Footballers from La Rioja (Spain)
Association football midfielders
La Liga players
Segunda División players
Segunda División B players
CD Logroñés footballers
Valencia CF players
Real Zaragoza players
RC Celta de Vigo players
Logroñés CF footballers
Spain under-21 international footballers
Spain under-23 international footballers
Spain international footballers
Olympic footballers of Spain
Footballers at the 1996 Summer Olympics